Nicholas Kole (born November 30, 1983) is an American pair skater. He currently competes with Amber Kole. They teamed up in 2006 and placed 16th at the 2007 United States Figure Skating Championships. In 2007 they came second at the 2008 Midwestern Sectional Championships and 13th at the 2008 United States Figure Skating Championships.

Kole was born in Littleton, Colorado. His first competition partner was Maroc Fassel, from 1997 to 1999. Kole subsequently competed with Brittany Vise, with whom he had a lot of success on the junior level, winning five medals on the Junior Grand Prix, including the silver medal at the 2005 Junior Grand Prix Final. They came sixth at the 2004 World Junior Figure Skating Championships. They competed three times as seniors on the Grand Prix circuit. Their highest placement was fifth at the 2005 NHK Trophy. Vise & Kole announced the end of their partnership on March 6, 2006.

Kole and an on and off partner, Amber Wehrle, were married on May 28, 2009. Kole and Kole retired from competitive skating November 2009 following the 2010 Midwestern Sectional Championships. Kole, along with his wife, currently coaches full-time at South Suburban Ice Arena in Centennial, Colorado.

Results

Pairs
(with Vise)

(with Wehrle)

 N = Novice level; J = Junior level

External links
 Icenetwork Article
 2007 Nationals profile
 
 Unseen Skaters profile

American male pair skaters
1983 births
Living people